Belief in witchcraft in Europe can be traced to classical antiquity and has continuous history during the Middle Ages, culminating in the Early Modern witch trials and giving rise to the fairy tale and popular culture "witch" stock character of modern times, as well as to the concept of the "modern witch" in Wicca and related movements of contemporary witchcraft.

In medieval and early modern Europe, accused witches were usually women who were believed to have used magic to cause harm and misfortune to members of their own community. Witchcraft was seen as immoral and often thought to involve communion with evil beings, such as a "Deal with the Devil". It was believed witchcraft could be thwarted by protective magic or counter-magic, which could be provided by the cunning folk. Suspected witches were also intimidated, banished, attacked or lynched. Often they would be formally prosecuted and punished if found guilty. European witch-hunts and witch trials in the early modern period led to tens of thousands of executions - almost always of women who did not practice witchcraft. European belief in witchcraft gradually dwindled during and after the Age of Enlightenment.

The topic is a complex amalgamation of the practices of folk healers, folk magic, ancient belief in sorcery in pagan Europe, Christian views on heresy, medieval and early modern practice of ceremonial magic and simple fiction in folklore and literature.

History

Antiquity

Instances of persecution of witchcraft in the classical period were documented, paralleling evidence from the ancient Near East and the Old Testament. In ancient Greece, for example, Theoris, a woman of Lemnos, was prosecuted for casting incantations and using harmful drugs. She was executed along with her family.

In Ancient Rome black magic was punished as a capital offence by the Law of the Twelve Tables, which are to be assigned to the 5th century BC, and, as Livy records, from time to time Draconian statutes were directed against those who attempted to blight crops and vineyards or to spread disease among flocks and cattle. The terms of the frequent references in Horace to Canidia illustrate the odium in which sorceresses were held.  Under the Empire, in the third century, the punishment of burning alive was enacted by the State against witches who compassed another person's death through their enchantments. Nevertheless, all the while normal legislation utterly condemned witchcraft and its works, while the laws were not merely carried out to their very letter, but reinforced by such emperors as Claudius, Vitellius, and Vespasian.

In the imperial period, it is evident from many Latin authors and from the historians that Rome swarmed with occultists and diviners, many of whom in spite of the Lex Cornelia almost openly traded in poisons, and not infrequently in assassination to boot. Paradoxical as it may appear, such emperors as Augustus, Tiberius, and Septimius Severus, while banishing from their realms all seers and necromancers, and putting them to death, in private entertained astrologers and wizards among their retinue, consulting their art upon each important occasion, and often even in the everyday and ordinary affairs of life. These prosecutions are significant, as they establish that and the prohibition under severest penalties, the sentence of death itself of witchcraft was demonstrably not a product of Christianity, but had long been employed  among polytheistic societies.

The ecclesiastical legislation followed a similar but milder course. The Council of Elvira (306), Canon 6, refused the holy Viaticum to those who had killed a man by a "per maleficium", translated as "visible effect of malicious intention" and adds the reason that such a crime could not be effected "without idolatry"; which probably means without the aid of the Devil, devil-worship and idolatry being then convertible terms. Similarly canon 24 of the Council of Ancyra (314) imposes five years of penance upon those who consult magicians, and here again the offence is treated as being a practical participation in paganism. This legislation represented the mind of the Church for many centuries. Similar penalties were enacted at the Eastern council in Trullo (692), while certain early Irish canons in the far West treated sorcery as a crime to be visited with excommunication until adequate penance had been performed.

The early legal codes of most European nations contain laws directed against witchcraft. Thus, for example, the oldest document of Frankish legislation, the Salic law, which was reduced to a written form and promulgated under Clovis, who died 27 November, 511, punishes those who practice magic with various fines, especially when it could be proven that the accused launched a deadly curse, or had tied the Witch's Knot. The laws of the Visigoths, which were to some extent founded upon the Roman law, punished witches who had killed any person by their spells with death; while long-continued and obstinate witchcraft, if fully proven, was visited with such severe sentences as slavery for life.

Christianization and Early Middle Ages
The Pactus Legis Alamannorum, an early 7th-century code of laws of the Alemanni confederation of Germanic tribes, lists witchcraft as a punishable crime on equal terms with poisoning. If a free man accuses a free woman of witchcraft or poisoning, the accused may be disculpated either by twelve people swearing an oath on her innocence or by one of her relatives defending her in a trial by combat. In this case, the accuser is required to pay a fine (Pactus Legis Alamannorum 13). Charles the Great prescribed the death penalty for anyone who would burn witches.

With Christianization, belief in witchcraft came to be seen as superstition. The Council of Leptinnes in 744 drew up a "List of Superstitions", which prohibited sacrifice to saints and created a baptismal formula that required one to renounce works of demons, specifically naming Thor and Odin. Persecution of witchcraft nevertheless persisted throughout most of the Early Middle Ages, into the 10th century.

When Charlemagne imposed Christianity upon the people of Saxony in 789, he proclaimed:

Similarly, the Lombard code of 643 states:

This conforms to the thoughts of Saint Augustine of Hippo, who taught that witchcraft did not exist and that the belief in it was heretical.

In 814, Louis the Pious upon his accession to the throne began to take very active measures against all sorcerers and necromancers, and it was owing to his influence and authority that the Council of Paris in 829 appealed to the secular courts to carry out any such sentences as the Bishops might pronounce. The consequence was that from this time forward the penalty of witchcraft was death, and there is evidence that if the constituted authority, either ecclesiastical or civil, seemed to slacken in their efforts the populace took the law into their own hands with far more fearful results.

In England, the early Penitentials are greatly concerned with the repression of pagan ceremonies, which under the cover of Christian festivities were very largely practised at Christmas and on New Year's Day. These rites were closely connected with witchcraft, and especially do S. Theodore, S. Aldhelm, Ecgberht of York, and other prelates prohibit the masquerade as a horned animal, a stag, or a bull, which S. Caesarius of Arles had denounced as a "foul tradition," an "evil custom," a "most heinous abomination." The laws of King Æthelstan (924–40), corresponsive with the early French laws, punished any person casting a spell which resulted in death by extracting the extreme penalty. 

Among the laws attributed to the Pictish King Cináed mac Ailpin (ruled 843 to 858), "is an important statute which enacts that all sorcerers and witches, and such as invoke spirits, "and use to seek upon them for helpe, let them be burned to death". Even then this was obviously no new penalty, but the statutory confirmation of a long-established punishment. So the witches of Forres who attempted the life of King Duffus in the year 968 by the old bane of slowly melting a wax image, when discovered, were according to the law burned at the stake." 

The Canon Episcopi, which was written circa 900 AD (though alleged to date from 314 AD), once more following the teachings of Saint Augustine, declared that witches did not exist and that anyone who believed in them was a heretic. The crucial passage from the Canon Episcopi reads as follows:

Early modern witch hunts

The origins of the accusations against witches in the Early Modern period are eventually present in trials against heretics, which trials include claims of secret meetings, orgies, and the consumption of babies. From the 15th century, the idea of a pact became important—one could be possessed by the Devil and not responsible for one's actions, but to be a witch, one had to sign a pact with the Devil, often to worship him, which was heresy and meant damnation. The idea of an explicit and ceremonial pact with the Devil was crucial to the development of the witchcraft concept, because it provided an explanation that differentiated the figure of the witch from that of the learned necromancer or sorcerer (whose magic was presumed to be diabolic in source, but with the power to wield it being achieved through rigorous application of study and complex ritual). A rise in the practice of necromancy in the 12th century, spurred on by an influx of texts on magic and diabolism from the Islamic world, had alerted clerical authorities to the potential dangers of malefic magic. This elevated concern was slowly expanded to include the common witch, but clerics needed an explanation for why uneducated commoners could perform feats of diabolical sorcery that rivaled those of the most seasoned and learned necromancers. The idea that witches gained their powers through a pact with the Devil provided a satisfactory explanation, and allowed authorities to develop a mythology through which they could project accusations of crimes formerly associated with various heretical sects (incestuous orgies, cannibalism, ritual infanticide, and the worship of demonic familiars) onto the newly emerging threat of diabolical witchcraft. This pact and the ceremony that accompanied it became widely known as the witches' sabbath.

By 1300, the elements were in place for a witch hunt, and for the next century and a half, fear of witches spread gradually throughout Europe. At the end of the Middle Ages (about 1450), the fear became a craze that lasted more than 200 years. As the notion spread that all magic involved a pact with the Devil, legal sanctions against witchcraft grew harsher. Each new conviction reinforced the beliefs in the methods (torture and pointed interrogation) being used to solicit confessions and in the list of accusations to which these "witches" confessed. The rise of the witch-craze was concurrent with the rise of Renaissance magic in the great humanists of the time (this was called High Magic, and the Neoplatonists and Aristotelians that practised it took pains to insist that it was wise and benevolent and nothing like Witchcraft), which helped abet the rise of the craze. Witchcraft was held to be the worst of heresies, and early skepticism slowly faded from view almost entirely.

In the early 14th century, many accusations were brought against clergymen and other learned people who were capable of reading and writing magic; Pope Boniface VIII (d. 1303) was posthumously tried for apostasy, murder, and sodomy, in addition to allegedly entering into a pact with the Devil (while popes had been accused of crimes before, the demonolatry charge was new). The Templars were also tried as Devil-invoking heretics in 1305–14. The middle years of the 14th century were quieter, but towards the end of the century, accusations increased and were brought against ordinary people more frequently. In 1398, the University of Paris declared that the demonic pact could be implicit; no document need be signed, as the mere act of summoning a demon constituted an implied pact. Tens of thousands of trials continued through Europe generation after generation; William Shakespeare wrote about the infamous "Three Witches" in his tragedy Macbeth during the reign of James I, who was notorious for his ruthless prosecution of witchcraft.

Accusations against witches were almost identical to those levelled by 3rd-century pagans against early Christians:

The craze took on new strength in the 15th century, and in 1486, Heinrich Kramer, a member of the Dominican Order, published the Malleus Maleficarum (the 'Hammer against the Witches'). This book was banned by the Church in 1490 and scholars are unclear on just how influential the Malleus was in its day. Less than one hundred years after it was written, the Council of the Inquisitor General in Spain discounted the credibility of the Malleus since it contained numerous errors.

Persecution continued through the Protestant Reformation in the 16th century, and the Protestants and Catholics both continued witch trials with varying numbers of executions from one period to the next. The "Caroline Code", the basic law code of the Holy Roman Empire (1532) imposed heavy penalties on witchcraft. As society became more literate (due mostly to the invention of the printing press in the 1440s), increasing numbers of books and tracts fueled the witch fears.

The craze reached its height between 1560 and 1660. After 1580, the Jesuits replaced the Dominicans as the chief Catholic witch-hunters, and the Catholic Rudolf II (1576–1612) presided over a long persecution in Austria. The Jura Mountains in southern Germany provided a small respite from the insanity; there, torture was imposed only within the precise limits of the Caroline Code of 1532, little attention was paid to the accusations of or by children, and charges had to be brought openly before a suspect could be arrested. These limitations contained the mania in that area.

The nuns of Loudun (1630), novelized by Aldous Huxley and made into a film by Ken Russell, provide an example of the craze during this time. The nuns had conspired to accuse Father Urbain Grandier of witchcraft by faking symptoms of possession and torment; they feigned convulsions, rolled and gibbered on the ground, and accused Grandier of indecencies. Grandier was convicted and burned; however, after the plot succeeded, the symptoms of the nuns only grew worse, and they became more and more sexual in nature. This attests to the degree of mania and insanity present in such witch trials.

In 1687, Louis XIV issued an edict against witchcraft that was rather moderate compared to former ones; it ignored black cats and other lurid fantasies of the witch mania. After 1700, the number of witches accused and condemned fell rapidly.

Witchcraft in Britain

In England, Scotland, Wales, and Ireland there was a succession of Witchcraft Acts starting with Henry VIII's Act of 1542. They governed witchcraft and providing penalties for its practice, or—after 1700—rather for pretending to practise it.

In Wales, witchcraft trials heightened in the 16th and 17th centuries, after the fear of it was imported from England. There was a growing alarm of women's magic as a weapon aimed against the state and church. The Church made greater efforts to enforce the canon law of marriage, especially in Wales where tradition allowed a wider range of sexual partnerships. There was a political dimension as well, as accusations of witchcraft were levied against the enemies of Henry VII, who was exerting more and more control over Wales.

The records of the Courts of Great Sessions for Wales, 1536–1736 show that Welsh custom was more important than English law. Custom provided a framework of responding to witches and witchcraft in such a way that interpersonal and communal harmony was maintained, Showing to regard to the importance of honour, social place and cultural status. Even when found guilty, execution did not occur.

Becoming king in 1603, James I brought to England and Scotland continental explanations of witchcraft. He set out the much stiffer Witchcraft Act of 1604, which made it a felony under common law. One goal was to divert suspicion away from male homosociality among the elite, and focus fear on female communities and large gatherings of women. He thought they threatened his political power so he laid the foundation for witchcraft and occultism policies, especially in Scotland. The point was that a widespread belief in the conspiracy of witches and a witches' Sabbath with the devil deprived women of political influence. Occult power was supposedly a womanly trait because women were weaker and more susceptible to the devil.

Enlightenment attitudes after 1700 made a mockery of beliefs in witches. The Witchcraft Act of 1735 marked a complete reversal in attitudes. Penalties for the practice of witchcraft as traditionally constituted, which by that time was considered by many influential figures to be an impossible crime, were replaced by penalties for the pretence of witchcraft. A person who claimed to have the power to call up spirits, or foretell the future, or cast spells, or discover the whereabouts of stolen goods, was to be punished as a vagrant and a con artist, subject to fines and imprisonment.

Hallucinogens and witchcraft

Arguments in favor
A number of modern researchers have argued for the existence of hallucinogenic plants in the practice of European witchcraft; among them, anthropologists Edward B. Taylor, Bernard Barnett, Michael J. Harner and Julio C. Baroja and pharmacologists Louis Lewin and Erich Hesse. Many medieval writers also comment on the use of hallucinogenic plants in witches' ointments, including Joseph Glanvill, Jordanes de Bergamo, Sieur de Beauvoys de Chauvincourt, Martin Delrio, Raphael Holinshed, Andrés Laguna, Johannes Nider, Sieur Jean de Nynald, Henry Boguet, Giovanni Porta, Nicholas Rémy, Bartolommeo Spina, Richard Verstegan, Johann Vincent and Pedro Ciruelo.

Much of the knowledge of herbalism in European witchcraft comes from the Spanish Inquisitors and other authorities, who occasionally recognized the psychological nature of the "witches' flight", but more often considered the effects of witches' ointments to be demonic or satanic.

Use patterns

Decoctions of deliriant nightshades (such as henbane, belladonna, mandrake, or datura) were used in European witchcraft. All of these plants contain hallucinogenic alkaloids of the tropane family, including hyoscyamine, atropine and scopolamine —the last of which is unique in that it can be absorbed through the skin. These concoctions are described in the literature variously as brews, salves, ointments, philtres, oils, and unguents. Ointments were mainly applied by rubbing on the skin, especially in sensitive areas—underarms, the pubic region, the forehead, the mucous membranes of the vagina and anus, or on areas rubbed raw ahead of time. They were often first applied to a "vehicle" to be "ridden" (an object such as a broom, pitchfork, basket, or animal skin that was rubbed against sensitive skin). All of these concoctions were made and used for the purpose of giving the witch special abilities to commune with spirits, transform into animals (lycanthropy), gain love, harm enemies, experience euphoria and sexual pleasure, and—importantly—to "fly to the witches' Sabbath".

Position of the church

Witches were not localised Christian distortions of pagans but people alleged to have both the ability and the will to employ supernatural effects for malignant ends. This belief is familiar from other cultures, and was partly inherited from paganism. The belief that witches were originally purely benign does not derive from any early textual source. However, the view of witches as malignant did stem from blatant misogyny of the time. The earliest written reference to witches as such, from Ælfric's homilies, portrays them as malign. The tendency to perceive them as healers begins only in the 19th century, with Jules Michelet whose novel La Sorcière, published in 1862, first postulated a benign witch.

It was in the Church's interest, as it expanded, to suppress all competing Pagan methodologies of magic. This could be done only by presenting a cosmology in which Christian miracles were legitimate and credible, whereas non-Christian ones were "of the devil". Hence the following law:

While the common people were aware of the difference between witches, who they considered willing to undertake evil actions, such as cursing, and cunning folk who avoided involvement in such activities, the Church attempted to blot out the distinction. In much the same way that culturally distinct non-Christian religions were all lumped together and termed merely "Pagan", so too was all magic lumped together as equally sinful and abhorrent. The Demonologie of James I explicitly condemns all magic-workers as equally guilty of the same crime against God.

"Witch" stock character

The characterization of the witch in Europe is not derived from a single source.
The familiar witch of folklore and popular superstition is a combination of numerous influences.

At the end of the Middle Ages, the recurring beliefs about witches were:

The Malleus Maleficarum (1486) declared that the four essential points of witchcraft were renunciation of the Catholic faith, devotion of body and soul to evil, offering up unbaptized children to the Devil, and engaging in orgies that included intercourse with the Devil; in addition, witches were accused of shifting their shapes, flying through the air, abusing Christian sacraments, and confecting magical ointments.

Witches were credited with a variety of magical powers. These fall into two broad categories: those that explain the occurrence of misfortune and are thus grounded in real events, and those that are wholly fantastic.

The first category includes the powers to cause impotence, to turn milk sour, to strike people dead, to cause diseases, to raise storms, to cause infants to be stillborn, to prevent cows from giving milk, to prevent hens from laying and to blight crops. The second includes the power to fly in the air, to change form into a hare, to suckle familiar spirits from warts, to sail on a single plank and perhaps most absurd of all, to go to sea in an eggshell.

Witches were often believed to fly on broomsticks or distaffs, or occasionally upon unwilling human beings, who would be called 'hag-ridden'. Horses found sweating in their stalls in the morning were also said to be hag-ridden.

The accused witch Isobel Gowdie gave the following charm as her means of transmuting herself into a hare:

Especially in media aimed at children (such as fairy tales), witches are often depicted as wicked old women with wrinkled skin and pointy hats, clothed in black or purple, with warts on their noses and sometimes long claw-like fingernails. Like the Three Witches from Macbeth, they are often portrayed as concocting potions in large cauldrons. Witches typically ride through the air on a broomstick as in the Harry Potter universe or in more modern spoof versions, a vacuum cleaner as in the Hocus Pocus universe. They are often accompanied by black cats. One of the most famous modern depictions is the Wicked Witch of the West, in L. Frank Baum's The Wonderful Wizard of Oz.

Witches also appear as villains in many 19th- and 20th-century fairy tales, folk tales and children's stories, such as "Snow White", "Hansel and Gretel", "Sleeping Beauty", and many other stories recorded by the Brothers Grimm. Such folktales typically portray witches as either remarkably ugly hags or remarkably beautiful young women.

In the novel by Fernando de Rojas, Celestina is an old prostitute who commits pimping and witchcraft in order to arrange sexual relationships.

Witches may also be depicted as essentially good, as in Archie Comics' long running Sabrina the Teenage Witch series, Terry Pratchett's Discworld novels, in Hayao Miyazaki's 1989 film Kiki's Delivery Service, or the television series Charmed (1998–2006). Following the film The Craft, popular fictional depictions of witchcraft have increasingly drawn from Wiccan practices, portraying witchcraft as having a religious basis and witches as humans of normal appearance.

See also

References

Further reading
 Barry, Jonathan, Marianne Hester, and Gareth Roberts, eds. Witchcraft in early modern Europe: studies in culture and belief (Cambridge UP, 1998).
 Brauner, Sigrid. Fearless wives and frightened shrews: the construction of the witch in early modern Germany (Univ of Massachusetts Press, 2001).
 Briggs, Robin. Witches & neighbours: the social and cultural context of European witchcraft (Viking, 1996).
 Clark, Stuart. Thinking with demons: the idea of witchcraft in early modern Europe (Oxford University Press, 1999).
 Even-Ezra, A., “Cursus: an early thirteenth century source for nocturnal flights and ointments in the work of Roland of Cremona,” Magic, Ritual and Witchcraft 12/2 (Winter 2017), 314–330.
 Kors, A.C. and E. Peters, eds. Witchcraft in Europe 400–1700. (2nd ed. University of Pennsylvania Press, 2001). .
 Martin, Lois. The History Of Witchcraft: Paganism, Spells, Wicca and more. (Oldcastle Books, 2015), popular history.
 Monter, E. William. Witchcraft in France and Switzerland: the Borderlands during the Reformation (Cornell University Press, 1976).
 Monter, E. William. "The historiography of European witchcraft: progress and prospects". journal of interdisciplinary history 2#4 (1972): 435–451. in JSTOR.
 .
 Scarre, Geoffrey, and John Callow. Witchcraft and magic in sixteenth-and seventeenth-century Europe (Palgrave Macmillan, 2001).
 Waite, Gary K. Heresy, Magic and Witchcraft in early modern Europe (Palgrave Macmillan, 2003).

European witchcraft